Baron Rathdonnell, of Rathdonnell in the County of Donegal, is a title in the Peerage of Ireland. It was created on 21 December 1868 for John McClintock, with remainder to the male issue of his deceased younger brother Captain William McClintock-Bunbury (who had represented County Carlow in the House of Commons). The barony is named after the townland of Rathdonnell, near the village of Trentagh, just north-west of Letterkenny.

The barony of Rathdonnell was the second-last barony created in the Peerage of Ireland. Lord Rathdonnell was succeeded according to the special remainder by his nephew, the second Baron, who sat in the House of Lords as an Irish Representative Peer from 1889 to 1929 and also served as Lord Lieutenant of County Carlow between 1890 and 1929.  the title is held by the fifth Baron, the second Baron's great-grandson, who succeeded his father in 1959.

The Arctic explorer, Admiral Sir Francis McClintock, was the nephew of the first Baron.

The family seat is Lisnavagh House, near Rathvilly, County Carlow.

Barons Rathdonnell (1868)
John McClintock, 1st Baron Rathdonnell (1798–1879)
Thomas Kane McClintock-Bunbury, 2nd Baron Rathdonnell (1848–1929)
Thomas Leopold McClintock-Bunbury, 3rd Baron Rathdonnell (1881–1937)
William Robert McClintock-Bunbury, 4th Baron Rathdonnell (1914–1959)
Thomas Benjamin McClintock-Bunbury, 5th Baron Rathdonnell (born 1938)

The heir apparent is the present holder's son, the Hon. William Leopold McClintock-Bunbury (born 1966).
The heir-in-line is his son, Thomas Anthony McClintock-Bunbury (born 2011).

Line of succession

 John McClintock (1770–1855)
  John McClintock, 1st Baron Rathdonnell (1798–1879)
 Capt. William Bunbury McClintock-Bunbury (1800–1866)
  Thomas Kane McClintock-Bunbury, 2nd Baron Rathdonnell (1848–1929), Rep. Peer from 1889 taking the 16th Baron of Dunsany's room, Southern Irish Senator in 1921
  Thomas Leopold McClintock-Bunbury, 3rd Baron Rathdonnell (1881–1937)
  William Robert McClintock-Bunbury, 4th Baron Rathdonnell (1914–1959)
  Thomas Benjamin McClintock-Bunbury, 5th Baron Rathdonnell (born 1938)
 (1) Hon. William Leopold McClintock-Bunbury (born 1966)
 (2) Thomas Anthony McClintock-Bunbury (born 2011)
 (3) Hon. George Andrew Kane McClintock-Bunbury (born 1968)
 (4) Shamus Alick McClintock-Bunbury (born 2001)
 (5) Hon. James Alexander Hugh McClintock-Bunbury (born 1972)

Arms

References

Kidd, Charles, Williamson, David (editors). Debrett's Peerage and Baronetage (1990 edition). New York: St Martin's Press, 1990.

Baronies in the Peerage of Ireland
Recipients of the Order of Saint Lazarus (statuted 1910)
Noble titles created in 1868
Noble titles created for UK MPs
Peerages created with special remainders